Manuel Santana Aguiar (11 October 1930 – 30 May 2009), better known as M. Boyer was an Indian tiatrist from Goa. Boyer, was originally from Marcaim in Ponda, and later moved to Raia. His parents were Sebastiao Floriano Aguiar and Mariquinha Luis. He was a talented actor from an early age, and he wrote and presented his first play Rinkari (Debtor) at the age of 18. His parents and principal tried to discourage him from pursuing his passion but despite all their attempts, he never gave up his love for the stage.

Writing, directing and producing more than 35 plays, participating in more than 5000 performances, composing and singing over 1000 songs, as well as performing in major Indian cities, in London, East Africa and the Middle East, M. Boyer made a significant contribution to the Konkani stage thereby, enriching leaving his special mark on the same. He also has been a source of inspiration for a lot of other artistes. He often left the stage to a thundering applause from his audiences and pleas for an encore performance.

M. Boyer believed that drama should not be just mere entertainment but should be an instrument to educate & inspire people to a better life, mentioned about always emphasizing the message of morality, peace and harmony in his plays, some of which include Chintnam Zalim Sopnam, Sounsar Sudorlo, Bhurgim Ani Bhangar Adim Tem Atam Hem, Ghor Dukhi Gaum Sukhi, Mog, Kazar, Divorce, Kazari Put Xezari. One tiatr which was notable was Ekuch Rosto, based on communal harmony shared between the two major communities of Goa. Apart from his unforgettable contributions to tiatrs, M Boyer lobbied for the preservation of Goan identity. He believed that Konkani alone could strengthen the foundations of Goan identity.

Awards

 Honoured for his Distinguished Services at the hands of Mr. Giani Zail Singh (then President of India) on the occasion of the Silver Jubilee Celebration of Goa's Liberation in 1986.
 In the year 1984-85, he was conferred with the State Cultural Award by the erstwhile Govt. of Goa, Daman & Diu.
 The 1994-95, the Sangeet Natak Akademi Award at the hands of the then President of India, Shri Shankar Dayal Sharma. He was the first Konkani stage artiste to receive this award.
 He was awarded the Padmashri award in 2005 at the hand of former president of India, Dr. Abdul Kalam.
 It is very rare for a cultural artist to receive both, the Sangeet Natak Academi Award and the Padmashri.

Family

M. Boyer married Eufregina Marta De Sousa in 1966, and they have 5 sons Sebastian, Remus, Stanford, Errol and Sywald.

References

 Tiatr Palkacho Patxai: Padmashri M. Boyer (King of Tiatr Stage: Padmashri M. Boyer), Michael Gracias, 2007

Singers from Goa
Konkani-language singers
2009 deaths
Tiatrists
1930 births
20th-century Indian singers
People from North Goa district
Recipients of the Padma Shri in arts
20th-century Indian male singers
Recipients of the Sangeet Natak Akademi Award